A list of adventure films released in the 1960s.

1960

1961

1962

1963

1964

1965

1966

1967

1968

1969

Notes

1960s adventure films
1960s
Lists of 1960s films by genre